The 2021 season was the 96th season in the existence of Barcelona Sporting Club, and the 63rd season in the top flight of Ecuadorian football. Barcelona was involved in three primary competitions: the main national tournament Liga Pro, the national cup called Copa Ecuador, and the international tournament Copa Libertadores.

The season was the second with Carlos Alfaro Moreno as president of the club. Barcelona's coach was Fabián Bustos. While the club failed to achieve domestic success, they did reach the semi-final stage of the Copa Libertadores for the fifth time in club history and the first time since 2017. They also contested the final of the Supercopa Ecuador.

Competitions

Liga Pro

First stage

Stage table

Results summary

Results by round

Matches

Second stage

Stage table

Results summary

Results by round

Matches

Copa Ecuador

The 2021 Copa Ecuador was cancelled due to logistical issues surrounding the ongoing impacts of the COVID-19 pandemic in Ecuador.

Supercopa Ecuador 

On 8 January 2021, FEF announced a February date and a four-team format for the Supercopa Ecuador to account for the cancellation of the 2020 Copa Ecuador. On 20 January 2021, Barcelona declined its participation in the competition to avoid a potential conflict with one of its sponsors. 

After numerous delays, the FEF announced a late-June date for the tournament on 5 June 2021. FEF further modified the format of the tournament to include six-teams, with Barcelona returning to the draw. As reigning champions of Ecuador, Barcelona were given a bye to the semi-final stage.

Copa Libertadores

Group stage (Group C)

Final stages

Round of 16

Barcelona won 3–2 on aggregate and advanced to the quarter-finals.

Quarter-finals

Tied 3–3 on aggregate. Barcelona advanced to the semi-finals via the away goals rule.

Semi-finals 

Flamengo won 4–0 on aggregate and advanced to the final.

Statistics

Goalscorers

References

External links 

Barcelona S.C. seasons